Football at the 1990 Asian Games was held in Beijing, China from 23 September to 6 October 1990.

Medalists

Medal table

Draw

Men
The teams were seeded based on their final ranking at the 1986 Asian Games.

Group A
 
 
 
 

Group B
 
 
 
 
 

Group C
 
 
 
 

Group D
 
 
 
 
 

The OCA expelled Iraq from the Games, India, Qatar and Indonesia withdrew. The revised draw took place few days before the competition.

Group A
 
 
 
 

Group B
 
 
 

Group C
 
 
 
 

Group D

Women

Group A
 
 
 
 

Group B
 
 
 
 

Thailand and the Philippines withdrew, the remaining teams played in a round robin competition.

Squads

Final standing

Men

Women

References

External links
 RSSSF

 
1990 Asian Games events
1990
Asia Games
1990 Asian Games